Anumodhanam is a 1978 Indian Malayalam-language film, directed by I. V. Sasi and produced by Thayyil Kunjikandan. The film stars Kamal Haasan, Vidhubala, Jayan, Sankaradi, Raghavan and Bahadoor. The musical score is by A. T. Ummer.

Plot
The protagonist Rajappan is employed, but wants one that uses his studies. He gets a job in a newspaper. He has a  younger sister Sridevi. Their parents died early. Rajappan Iooks after her. Rajappan marries their neighbour Thankhamma. Vijayan and Sridevi are in love and Rajappan fixes their marriage. One day their manager's son James arrives in the press because of the manager's illness. He is a smuggler. His friend Raghavan is with him. One day Sridevi comes to eat with Rajappan. James sees her and likes her. Raghavan says that she is a poor girl and warns him no to follow her.

One day Rajappan, Vijayan and Thankhamma take the ornaments and saree for Sridevi's marriage. James tells his assistant to tell Sridevi's friend Ragini that Rajappan was arrested for drugs and to bring Sridevi to his house. Ragini tells her but she is afraid. James' assistant comes to Sridevi's house and tells her to talk to James because the police inspector is his friend. Sridevi goes with him to James and closes the door. They fight and he rapes her. Raghavan sees all this. Rajappan arrived with things for Sridevi, but she is unhappy and her face and lips are injured. Rajappan asks her what happened, but she does not tell him. After some days Sridevi's marriage day comes, but they cannot find her. Ragini says that Sridevi's body is at the seashore.

Rajappan wonders why she suicided. One day Vvijayan comes to Sridevi's room and sees her letter that explains what happened. Raghavan says to James that this was because of you and that he will tell everyone about the rape. Raghavan tells Rajappan and Inspector Gopi. While Raghavan is searching for James, his assistants capture him. He kills Raghavan and throws his body into the sea. Rajappan finds him, but James wins and tries to kill him, Vijayan kills James from behind. He goes to the sea and sees Sridevi who tells him to come with her and he suicide.

Cast 
Kamal Haasan
Vidhubala
Sankaradi
Raghavan
Bahadoor
M. G. Soman
Jayan
Seema

Production
Anumodhanam was directed by I. V. Sasi and produced by Thayyil Kunjikandan for Chelavoor Pictures. This film was shot in black-and-white. It was given an "U" (Unrestricted) certificate by the Central Board of Film Certification.

Soundtrack
The music was composed by A. T. Ummer with lyrics by Bharanikkavu Sivakumar.

References

External links
 

1970s Malayalam-language films
1978 films
Films directed by I. V. Sasi
Indian black-and-white films
Films about rape in India